James William "Jim" Denver (October 23, 1817 – August 9, 1892) was an American politician, soldier and lawyer. He served in the California state government, as an officer in the United States Army in two wars, and as a Democratic member of the United States House of Representatives from California. He served as secretary and Governor of the Kansas Territory during the struggle over whether or not Kansas would be open to slavery. The city of Denver, Colorado, is named after him.

Early life and career
James W. Denver was born near Winchester, Virginia. He attended public schools and moved to Ohio with his parents in 1830, settling near Wilmington. In 1841 he taught school in Missouri, and in 1844 he graduated from the law school of the University of Cincinnati. He was admitted to the bar and practiced law near Xenia, Ohio. He moved to Platte City, Missouri, in 1845, where he continued his law practice and acting career.

In 1847, during the Mexican–American War, he recruited a company for the 12th U.S. Volunteer Infantry and was commissioned a captain, serving under General Winfield Scott. After the war in 1850, Denver traveled to California, where he became a trader. Denver killed newspaper editor Edward Gilbert in a duel on August 2, 1852. Later that same year, he was elected to the California State Senate. He was later appointed as Secretary of State of California. In 1854 he was elected to the United States Congress as representative from California, serving from March 4, 1855 – March 3, 1857. He was not a candidate for renomination in 1856. On April 17, 1857, President James Buchanan appointed him as Commissioner of Indian Affairs.

On June 17, 1857, Denver was appointed by Buchanan as Secretary of the Kansas Territory. In December 1857 he was appointed as Territorial Governor.  On the day that Denver assumed the territorial governorship, citizens in the territory voted on the Lecompton Constitution, which opened the territory to slavery. The vote offered a choice only between full slavery and limited slavery in the territory and was thus largely boycotted by Free-Staters who were in favor of abolishing slavery.  The pro-slavery constitution passed by an overwhelming margin.  Later it was discovered that several thousand votes were cast fraudulently by "Border Ruffians" who had crossed into the territory from Missouri in order to cast pro-slavery ballots (The vote was overturned by a subsequent election in August 1858, and Kansas was later admitted to the Union, in 1861, as a free state. See Bleeding Kansas for details.).

In November 1858, while Denver was still serving as territorial governor, William Larimer, Jr., a land speculator from Leavenworth, planted the townsite of "Denver City" along the South Platte River in Arapaho County in western Kansas Territory (the present-day state of Colorado).  Larimer chose the name "Denver" to honor the current territorial governor with the intention that the city would be chosen as the county seat of Arapaho County.

Denver retired as territorial governor in November 1858, was reappointed Commissioner of Indian Affairs, and served until his resignation on March 31, 1859.

Civil War and later career
A few months after the start of the American Civil War in early 1861, President Abraham Lincoln commissioned Denver a brigadier general in the volunteer army on August 14. In November 1861, he was ordered to report to Fort Scott in Kansas and in December, he assumed command of all Federal troops in Kansas. During March and April 1862 he commanded the District of Kansas until he was transferred to the District of West Tennessee.  On May 16, 1862, Denver assumed command of the 3rd Brigade/5th Division under Maj. Gen. William T. Sherman in the midst of the Siege of Corinth.  The very next day Denver's brigade participated in the fight for Russell's House.  Though his brigade suffered no casualties in this engagement it was nonetheless one of the two brigades leading the attack.  On May 27 General Sherman again selected Denver's brigade to be one of the leading units in an attack against the Double Log House.  Denver and Morgan L. Smith's brigade successfully stormed the log cabin turned block house. During this engagement Major General Ulysses S. Grant was present on the battlefield and indicated his approval of the handsome manner in which the troops behaved.  After the fall of Corinth Denver continued in command of his brigade, serving on garrison duty in Mississippi.  During the early stages of the Vicksburg Campaign Denver was in command of the 1st Division, XVI Corps, until his resignation from the Union Army on March 5, 1863.

After the war, Denver practiced law in Washington, D.C., and Wilmington, Ohio; he and his family lived in the Rombach Place while residing in Wilmington. He served as a delegate to the Democratic National Convention in 1876, 1880, and 1884. He was mentioned as a possible Democratic presidential nominee in 1876 and 1884, although his name was never offered into formal nomination.

Denver reportedly visited Denver, Colorado, in 1875 and 1882, but complained that his visits received little affection from the residents of the city named after him.

He died in Washington, D.C., in 1892 and is buried in Sugar Grove Cemetery in Wilmington, Ohio.

His son, Matthew R. Denver, was a U.S. Congressman from Ohio from 1907–1913.

References

Further reading
 Barns, George C., Denver, the Man; the Life, Letters and Public Papers of the Lawyer, Soldier and Statesman. Wilmington, Ohio, 1949.
 Cook, Edward Magruder (ed.), Justified by Honor: Highlights in the Life of General James William Denver. Falls Church, Virginia: Higher Education Publications, 1988.

External links

Denver's papers at the University of Kansas
Guide to the James William Denver Papers at The Bancroft Library

|-

|-

1817 births
1892 deaths
19th-century American lawyers
19th-century American politicians
American duellists
American military personnel of the Mexican–American War
Bleeding Kansas
Burials in Ohio
California state senators
Democratic Party members of the United States House of Representatives from California
Governors of Kansas Territory
History of Denver
Kansas Democrats
Lawyers from Washington, D.C.
Members of the United States House of Representatives from California
Missouri lawyers
Ohio Democrats
Ohio lawyers
People from Platte City, Missouri
People from Wilmington, Ohio
People from Winchester, Virginia
People of Kansas in the American Civil War
Politicians from Xenia, Ohio
Secretaries of State of California
United States Army officers
University of Cincinnati College of Law alumni